"Girl" is a song recorded by American country music singer Maren Morris for her second studio album of the same name. Morris co-wrote the song with Sarah Aarons and its producer Greg Kurstin. It was released to American country radio on January 18, 2019 through Columbia Nashville as the album's first single. The song has been certified platinum in the United States and Canada.

Music video
The music video was directed by Dave Meyers and premiered on CMT, GAC and Vevo in January 2019. It begins and ends with Morris giving a spoken-word monologue about what it means to be a girl, and is interspersed with footage of Morris performing on stage, and various anonymous women going through hardships in life, as well Morris being critiqued by male music executive.

Commercial performance
"Girl" reached a peak of Number One on the Billboard Country Airplay chart dated August 3, 2019. It is the singer's third single to reach the top of the Country Airplay chart, and it was also the first solo female song to lead the chart in over a year, since Kelsea Ballerini's "Legends" in February 2018. The following week, it fell to number 13, making it the first song to fall out of the top 10 from Number One since Shania Twain's "You Win My Love" fell from number 1 to number 11 in 1996.

The song was certified Gold by the RIAA on July 17, 2019, and Platinum  later the same year on October 10 for one million units in combined sales and streams. It has sold 155,000 copies in the United States as of December 2019.

Credits and personnel
Credits adapted from Tidal.

 Maren Morris – vocals, backing vocals, songwriter
 Greg Kurstin – producer, songwriter, drums
 Sarah Aarons – songwriter

Charts

Weekly charts

Year-end charts

Certifications

Release history

References

2019 songs
2019 singles
Maren Morris songs
Columbia Nashville Records singles
Songs written by Greg Kurstin
Songs written by Sarah Aarons
Song recordings produced by Greg Kurstin
Music videos directed by Dave Meyers (director)
Songs written by Maren Morris